Summer Lane railway station was a railway station on the Barnsley to Penistone line situated some  from Barnsley Exchange, South Yorkshire, England. The station was opened in 1854 by the Manchester, Sheffield and Lincolnshire Railway and was closed between December 1859 and February 1867 when it was reopened.

It was finally closed by British Railways on 29 June 1959 when the local passenger services were withdrawn from other stations on the lines in the area such as Barnsley Court House, Silkstone and Dodworth.

References

Disused railway stations in Barnsley
Railway stations in Great Britain opened in 1854
Railway stations in Great Britain closed in 1959
Former Great Central Railway stations